Christina Hvide (in Swedish: Kristina Stigsdotter) (c. 1145 – c. 1200) was Queen of Sweden as the wife of King Charles VII and the mother of King Sverker II of Sweden.

Life
Christina Stigsdatter was the daughter of the Danish nobleman Stig Tokesen (died 1150) of the Hvide family from Scania (then a Danish province) and the Danish Princess Margaret of Denmark who was the daughter of Canute Lavard. She was married to King Charles VII of Sweden in 1163 (or 1164) and was in Sweden known as Queen Kristina. In 1163, the Swedish jarl Guttorm greeted her in Scania and travelled with her to Sweden, but it is guessed that the ceremony took place after the inauguration of the new archbishop Stefan (archbishop of Uppsala) in 1164. When her husband was deposed in 1167, she fled to Denmark with her son.

The date of her birth and death is not known, but suggested to be c. 1145 and c. 1200 respectively.

Children
Sverker II of Sweden (1164–1210), King of Sweden 1195–1208.

References
 Åke Ohlmarks: Alla Sveriges drottningar (All the queens of Sweden) (Swedish)

Christina 1163
1140s births
1200 deaths
12th-century Swedish women
12th-century Danish women
12th-century Danish people
12th-century Swedish people
Queen mothers